Global Governance Institute (GGI) is an independent non-profit think tank based in Brussels. It brings together policy-makers, scholars and practitioners from the world's leading institutions in order to devise, strengthen and improve forward-looking approaches to global governance.

GGI's vision is a more equitable, peaceful and sustainable global order based on effective but accountable international organizations, the global rule of law and the empowerment of the individual across borders and cultures. GGI places particular emphasis on the improvement of the United Nations system and its mutual reinforcement with strong regional organizations.

It currently has about 50 members, working on research in core areas of global governance, such as:
Peace & Security
Global Justice (including International Law & Human Rights)
Environment & Sustainable Development
Economic Policy
Forward Studies & Innovation

Major current initiatives

GGI is a partner of the Security and Defence Agenda's Security Jam from 19 to 23 March 2012. It organises a High-Level event on Operationalising the Responsibility to Protect on 26 April 2012 with Madiaraga, the College of Europe Foundation. Further research in 2012 includes work on the International Criminal Court, the Transparency, Technology and Democracy and Cybersecurity.

Publications

Publications by the Global Governance Institute include:
The International Criminal Court and Kenya: National Justice through Global Mechanisms?
The UN Peacebuilding Architecture - Background Note
The United Nations Entity for Gender Equality and the Empowerment of Women (UN Women)
The Changing Constellation of Power & Resistance in the Global Debate over Agrofuels
European Civilian Crisis Management: Bridging the Resources Gap?

References

External links
Global Governance Institute

Think tanks based in Belgium